Advanced Placement (AP) Art History (also known as AP Art, or APAH) is an Advanced Placement art history course and exam offered by the College Board.

AP Art History is designed to allow students to examine major forms of artistic expression relevant to a variety of cultures evident in a wide variety of periods from present times into the past. Students acquire an ability to examine works of art critically, with intelligence and sensitivity, and to articulate their thoughts and experiences. The course content covers prehistoric, Mediterranean, European, American, Native American, African, Asian, Pacific, and contemporary art and architecture.

Course 
The course is designed to teach the following art historical skills: 
Visual Analysis
Contextual Analysis
Comparisons of Works of Art
Artistic Traditions
Visual Analysis of Unknown Works
Attribution of Unknown Works
Art Historical Interpretations
Argumentation

The course is also built on five core "Big Ideas": 
Culture
Interactions with Other Cultures
Theories and Interpretations
Materials, Processes, and Techniques
Purpose and Audience

Starting in the 2015–2016 school year, College Board has introduced a new curriculum and exam for students to apply art historical skills to questions.

Exam

Score distribution
The multiple choice section of the exam is worth 50% of a student's score and the free-response is worth 50%. Each correctly answered multiple choice question is worth one point. Wrong and omitted questions do not affect the raw score. For the free-response section, the four short essays are each graded on a scale of 0 to 5 and the two long essays are each graded on a scale of 0 to 7.

Works studied 
The current curriculum, which began in 2015, focuses on 250 works of art and architecture across 10 units, beginning with prehistoric art and ending with contemporary art.

Global Prehistory (30,000 - 500 BCE)
 Apollo 11 stone
 Great Hall of the Bulls
 Camelid sacrum in the shape of a canine
 Running horned woman
 Beaker with ibex motifs
 Anthropomorphic stele
 Jade cong
 Stonehenge
 The Ambum stone
 Tlatilco female figurine
 Terra cotta fragment

Ancient Mediterranean (3500 BCE - 300 CE)
 White Temple and its ziggurat
 Palette of King Narmer
 Statues of votive figures, from the Square Temple at Eshunna (modern Tell Asmar, Iraq)
 Seated scribe
 Standard of Ur from the Royal Tombs at Ur (modern Tell el-Muqayyar, Iraq)
 Great Pyramids (Menkaura, Khafre, Khufu) and Great Sphinx
 King Menkaura and queen
 The Code of Hammurabi
 Temple of Amun-Re and Hypostyle Hall
 Mortuary temple of Hatshepsut
 Akhenaten, Nefertiti, and three daughters
 Tutankhamun's tomb, innermost coffin
 Last judgement of Hunefer, from his tomb (page from the Book of the Dead)
 Lamassu from the citadel of Sargon II, Dur Sharrukin (modern Khorsabad, Iraq)
 Athenian agora
 Anavysos Kouros
 Peplos Kore from the Acropolis
 Sarcophagus of the Spouses
 Audience Hall (apadana) of Darius and Xerxes
 Temple of Minerva (Veii, near Rome, Italy) and sculpture of Apollo
 Tomb of the Triclinium
 Niobides Krater
 Doryphoros (Spear Bearer)
 Acropolis
 Grave stele of Hegeso
 Winged Victory of Samothrace
 Great Altar of Zeus and Athena at Pergamon
 House of the Vettii
 Alexander Mosaic from the House of Faun, Pompeii
 Seated boxer
 Head of a Roman patrician
 Augustus of Prima Porta
 Colosseum (Flavian Amphitheater)
 Forum of Trajan
 Pantheon
 Ludovisi Battle Sarcophagus

Early Europe and Colonial Americas (200 - 1750 CE)
 Catacomb of Priscilla
 Santa Sabina
 Rebecca and Eliezer at the Well and Jacob Wrestling the Angel, from the Vienna Genesis
 San Vitale
 Hagia Sophia
 Merovingian looped fibulae
 Virgin (Theotokos) and Child between Saints Theodore and George
 Lindisfarne Gospels: St. Matthew, cross-carpet page; St. Luke portrait page; St. Luke incipit page
 Great Mosque
 Pyxis of al-Mughira
 Church of Sainte-Foy
 Bayeux Tapestry
 Chartres Cathedral
 Dedication Page with Blanche of Castile and King Louis IX of France, Scenes from the Apocalypse
 Röttgen Pietà
 Arena (Scrovegni) Chapel, including Lamentation
 Golden Haggadah (The Plagues of Egypt, Scenes of Liberation, and Preparation for Passover)
 Alhambra
 Annunciation Triptych (Merode Altarpiece)
 Pazzi Chapel
 The Arnolfini Portrait
 David
 Palazzo Rucellai
 Madonna and Child with Two Angels
 Birth of Venus
 Last Supper
 Adam and Eve
 Sistine Chapel ceiling and altar wall frescoes
 School of Athens
 Isenheim altarpiece
 Entombment of Christ
 Allegory of Law and Grace
 Venus of Urbino
 Frontispiece of the Codex Mendoza
 Il Gesù, including Triumph of the Name of Jesus ceiling fresco
 Hunters in the Snow
 Mosque of Selim II
 Calling of Saint Matthew
 Henri IV Receives the Portrait of Marie de' Medici, from the Marie de' Medici Cycle
 Self-Portrait with Saskia
 San Carlo alle Quattro Fontane
 Ecstasy of Saint Teresa
 Angel with Arquebus, Asiel Timor Dei
 Las Meninas
 Woman Holding a Balance
 The Palace at Versailles
 Screen with the Siege of Belgrade and hunting scene
 The Virgin of Guadalupe (Virgen de Guadalupe)
 Fruit and Insects
 Spaniard and Indian Produce a Mestizo
 The Tête à Tête, from Marriage à la Mode

Later Europe and Americas (1750 - 1980 CE)
 Portrait of Sor Juana Inés de la Cruz
 A Philosopher Giving a Lecture on the Orrery
 The Swing
 Monticello
 The Oath of the Horatii
 George Washington
 Self-Portrait
 Y no hai remedio (And There’s Nothing to Be Done), from Los Desastres de la Guerra (The Disasters of War), plate 15
 La Grande Odalisque
 Liberty Leading the People
 The Oxbow (View from Mount Holyoke, Northampton, Massachusetts, after a Thunderstorm)
 Still Life in Studio
 Slave Ship (Slavers Throwing Overboard the Dead and Dying, Typhoon Coming On)
 Palace of Westminster (Houses of Parliament)
 The Stone Breakers
 Nadar Raising Photography to the Height of Art
 Olympia
 The Saint-Lazare Station
 The Horse in Motion
 The Valley of Mexico from the Hillside of Santa Isabel (El Valle de México desde el Cerro de Santa Isabel)
 The Burghers of Calais
 The Starry Night
 The Coiffure
 The Scream
 Where Do We Come From? What Are We? Where Are We Going?
 Carson, Pirie, Scott and Company Building
 Mont Sainte-Victoire
 Les Demoiselles d'Avignon
 The Steerage
 The Kiss
 The Kiss
 The Portuguese
 Goldfish
 Improvisation 28 (second version)
 Self-Portrait as a Soldier
 Memorial Sheet for Karl Liebknecht
 Villa Savoye
 Composition with Red, Blue, and Yellow
 Illustration from The Results of the First Five-Year Plan
 Object (Le Déjeuner en fourrure)
 Fallingwater
 The Two Fridas
 The Migration of the Negro, Panel no. 49
 The Jungle
 Dream of a Sunday Afternoon in the Alameda Park
 Fountain (second version)
 Woman, I
 Seagram Building
 Marilyn Diptych
 Narcissus Garden
 The Bay
 Lipstick (Ascending) on Caterpillar Tracks
 Spiral Jetty
 House in New Castle County

Indigenous Americas (1000 BCE - 1980 CE)
 Chavín de Huántar
 Mesa Verde cliff dwellings
 Yaxchilán
 Great Serpent Mound
 Templo Mayor (Main Temple)
 Ruler’s feather headdress (probably of Motecuhzoma II)
 City of Cusco, including Qorikancha (Inka main temple), Santo Domingo (Spanish colonial convent), and Walls at Saqsa Waman (Sacsayhuaman)
 Maize cobs
 City of Machu Picchu
 All-T’oqapu tunic
 Bandolier bag
 Transformation mask
 Painted elk hide
 Black-on-black ceramic vessel

Africa (1100 - 1980 CE)
 Conical tower and circular wall of Great Zimbabwe
 Great Mosque of Djenné
 Wall plaque, from Oba's palace
 Sika dwa kofi (Golden Stool)
 Ndop (portrait figure) of 
 Power figure (Nkisi n'kondi)
 Female (Pwo) mask
 Portrait mask (Mblo)
 Bundu mask
 Ikenga (shrine figure)
 Lukasa (memory board)
 Aka elephant mask
 Reliquary figure (byeri)
 Veranda post of enthroned king and senior wife (Opo Ogoga)

West and Central Asia (500 BCE - 1980 CE)
 Petra, Jordan: Treasury and Great Temple
 Buddha
 The Kaaba
 Jowo Rinpoche, enshrined in the Jokhang Temple
 Dome of the Rock
 Great Mosque (Masjid-e Jameh)
 Folio from a Qur'an
 Basin (Baptistère de St. Louis)
 Bahram Gur Fights the Karg, folio from the Great Il-Khanid Shahnama
 The Court of Gayumars, folio from Shah Tahmasp's Shahnama
 The Ardabil Carpet

South, East, and Southeast Asia (300 BCE - 1980 CE)
 Great Stupa at Sanchi
 Terra cotta warriors from mausoleum of the first Qin emperor of China
 Funeral banner of Lady Dai (Xin Zhui)
 Longmen caves
 Gold and jade crown
 Todai-ji
 Borobudur Temple
 Angkor, the temple of Angkor Wat, and the city of Angkor Thom, Cambodia
 Lakshmana Temple
 Travelers among Mountains and Streams
 Shiva as Lord of Dance (Nataraja)
 Night Attack on the Sanjô Palace
 The David Vases
 Portrait of Sin Sukju (1417-1475)
 Forbidden City
 Ryoan-ji
 Jahangir Preferring a Sufi Shaikh to Kings
 Taj Mahal
 White and Red Plum Blossoms
 Under the Wave off Kanagawa (Kanagawa oki nami ura), also known as the Great Wave, from the series Thirty-six Views of Mount Fuji
 Chairman Mao en Route to Anyuan

The Pacific (700 - 1980 CE)
 Nan Madol
 Moai on platform (ahu)
 'Ahu 'ula (feather cape)
 Staff god
 Female deity
 Buk (mask)
 Hiapo (tapa)
 Tamati Waka Nene
 Navigation chart
 Malagan display and mask
 Presentation of Fijian mats and tapa cloths to Queen Elizabeth II

Global Contemporary (1980 CE - Present)
 The Gates
 Vietnam Veterans Memorial
 Horn Players
 Summer Trees
 Androgyne III
 A Book from the Sky
 Pink Panther
 Untitled #228, from the History Portraits series
 ''The French Collection Part I, #1: Dancing at the Louvre
 Trade (Gifts for Trading Land with White People)
 Earth's Creation
 Rebellious Silence, from the Women of Allah series
 En la Barberia no se Llora (No Crying Allowed in the Barbershop)
 Pisupo Lua Afe (Corned Beef 2000)
 Electronic Superhighway
 The Crossing
 Guggenheim Museum Bilbao
 Pure Land
 Lying with the Wolf
 Darkytown Rebellion
 The Swing (after Fragonard)
 Old Man's Cloth
 Stadia II
 Preying Mantra
 Shibboleth
 MAXXI National Museum of XXI Century Arts
 Kui Hua Zi (Sunflower Seeds)

Notes

References

Further reading
 The College Board, AP® Art History Course and Exam Description, Effective Fall 2015, November 20, 2015; revised and corrected edition April 21, 2017. Includes sample tests and curricula, with appendices on 250 required works.
  An open educational resource for art history, with free images and texts on 250 required works of art in revised exam.
 Khan Academy, AP® Art History, free study resource keyed to revised exam.
  Text with CD-ROM  Third edition focused on 250 required works in revised exam.

External links
 AP Art History at CollegeBoard.com

Art history
Advanced Placement
Visual arts education